Olšovec is a municipality and village in Přerov District in the Olomouc Region of the Czech Republic. It has about 500 inhabitants.

Administrative parts
The village of Boňkov is an administrative part of Olšovec.

References

Villages in Přerov District